Maungakiekie is a New Zealand parliamentary electorate, returning one Member of Parliament to the New Zealand House of Representatives. The current MP for Maungakiekie is Priyanca Radhakrishnan of the Labour Party. The name is from Maungakiekie / One Tree Hill, a large and symbolically important hill at the western end of the seat; the name denotes the presence of kiekie vines on the hill.

The core of Maungakiekie is the suburbs of Auckland clustered around the Southern Motorway, and the most southern parts of the Auckland isthmus facing the Manukau Harbour. As at 2008, these include Penrose, Panmure, Onehunga and Royal Oak. In character, the seat is a minority-majority seat, with a large Māori, Pacific Island and Asian population. It is also quite a young seat, with 46.8 percent of the seat's residents under the age of thirty.

History

Because of the area's seats' tendency to vote Labour, and because Labour suffered its worst result since World War II in 1996, with votes splintering off to both the Alliance and New Zealand First, Onehunga MP Richard Northey found himself ousted from Parliament in 1996 at the hands of then unknown National Party candidate Belinda Vernon.

Sam Lotu-liga captured the seat again for National in the large swing against Labour in 2008. On 13 December 2016, Lotu-liga announced that he was quitting politics, to take effect at the 2017 general election. The electorate was won by Denise Lee at the election, retaining the seat for the National Party.

Members of Parliament
Unless otherwise stated, all MPs' terms began and ended at general elections.

Key

List MPs
Members of Parliament elected from party lists in elections where that person also unsuccessfully contested the Maungakiekie electorate. Unless otherwise stated, all MPs terms began and ended at general elections.

Election results

2020 election

2017 election

2014 election

2011 election

Electorate (as at 26 November 2011): 46,637

2008 election

2005 election

2002 election

1999 election

1996 election

Table footnotes

References

New Zealand electorates in the Auckland Region
1996 establishments in New Zealand